Charles Harold Knott (20 March 1901 – 18 June 1988), known as John Knott, was an English amateur cricketer who played in the inter-war period. Knott played mainly for Kent County Cricket Club and Oxford University, making a total of 136 first-class cricket appearances during his career.

Knott attended Tonbridge School and made his first-class cricket debut for Kent in 1921 after completing school, appearing in a County Championship against Nottinghamshire. He attended Oxford University, gaining a cricket Blue and playing in three varsity matches between 1922 and 1924. He continued playing for Kent during his years at university before becoming a teacher at Tonbridge where he was master-in-charge of cricket, coaching, amongst others, Colin Cowdrey.

Knott was considered a powerful batsman who could drive effectively. He played for Kent mainly during the school holidays when not working. His brother, Freddie Knott, had played cricket for Kent before World War I. Knott died in 1988. At the time of his death he was the oldest living Kent player and the oldest to have gained a cricket Blue at Oxford.

References

External links

Kent cricketers
English cricketers
1901 births
1988 deaths
Marylebone Cricket Club cricketers
Harlequins cricketers
Oxford University cricketers
People educated at Tonbridge School
Alumni of Brasenose College, Oxford